Centerville is an unincorporated community in Linn County, Kansas, United States. As of the 2020 census, the population of the community and nearby areas was 78.

History
The first post office in Centerville was established in March 1855.  Currently, Centerville has a post office with ZIP code 66014.

Geography

Climate
The climate in this area is characterized by hot, humid summers and generally mild to cool winters.  According to the Köppen Climate Classification system, Centerville has a humid subtropical climate, abbreviated "Cfa" on climate maps.

Demographics

For statistical purposes, the United States Census Bureau has defined Centerville as a census-designated place (CDP).

Education
The community is served by Prairie View USD 362 public school district.

Notable people
Centerville was the birthplace of the dancer and choreographer Wayne Lamb.

References

Further reading

External links
 Linn County maps: Current, Historic, KDOT

Unincorporated communities in Linn County, Kansas
Unincorporated communities in Kansas